St. Barnabas Episcopal Church may refer to:

in the United States
St. Barnabas Episcopal Church (Foreman, Arkansas)
St. Barnabas Episcopal Church (Montrose, Iowa)
St. Barnabas' Episcopal Church (Newark, New Jersey)
St. Barnabas Episcopal Church (Troy, New York)
Church of St. Barnabas (Irvington, New York)
St. Barnabas Episcopal Church (Snow Hill, North Carolina)